Royds Hall Academy is a mixed secondary school for pupils aged 11 – 16. It is located in Huddersfield, West Yorkshire, England, and on the north side of the Colne Valley towards Milnsbridge.

History
Royds Hall was a large farmhouse in the Paddock and Longwood area of Huddersfield, adjoining Royds Wood. It was rebuilt as a grander mansion (still called Royds Hall, but also known as 'Royds Wood'. It was still referred to on the town plan published in 1890 as Royds Hall), whose philanthropic mill owner served the increasingly industrialised and expanding town. The building was formerly Royds Hall Mansion, built in 1866 by Sir Joseph Crosland, the Conservative MP for the Huddersfield constituency from 1893–95. On his death in 1904 he left the property to his nephew Thomas Pearson Crosland, who sold it to Huddersfield Corporation in 1915 for £17,000. The Hall served as a military hospital during and after the First World War.

Royds Hall Grammar School opened on 20 September 1921, which became a comprehensive school in 1963. In February 2014, the later Royds Hall High School changed its name to Royds Hall Community School.The school is divided into five houses (known as communities) named after Marie Curie, Martin Luther King, Nelson Mandela, Emily Pankhurst and Harold Wilson.

Previously a foundation school administered by Kirklees Metropolitan Borough Council, in 2018 Royds Hall converted to academy status. The school is now sponsored by the SHARE Multi Academy Trust.

Notable alumni

Royds Hall Community School
 Ruben Reuter, actor

Royds Hall Grammar School
 Robert Baldick, French literature scholar
 J Margaret Evans (née Hadfield), 1927-35 head girl, junior bursar 1965-1970 and founding fellow, emeritus fellow from 1985 until death in 2001 Lucy Cavendish College Cambridge
 Sir Richard Sykes, biochemist, chief executive of Glaxo plc from 1993–97, rector of Imperial College London from 2001–08, and chancellor since 2013 of Brunel University London
 Harold Wilson, Labour Party leader from 1963 to 1976; UK prime minister from 1964 to 1970, and from 1974 to 1976

See also
Listed buildings in Golcar

References

External links
 Royds Hall Academy official website

Schools in Huddersfield
Educational institutions established in 1921
1921 establishments in England
Academies in Kirklees
Primary schools in Kirklees
Secondary schools in Kirklees